Victoire of France (Marie Louise Thérèse Victoire; 11 May 1733 – 7 June 1799) was a French princess, the daughter of King Louis XV and Marie Leszczyńska. She was named after her parents and Queen Maria Theresa, her great-great-grandmother and the consort of Louis XIV of France.

Originally known as Madame Quatrième, signifying the fourth daughter of the King (an older sister, Marie Louise, had died in February 1733, before her birth), she was later known as Madame Victoire. She outlived eight of her nine siblings, and was survived by her older sister Madame Adélaïde by less than a year. The sisters were collectively known as Mesdames.

Life

Early years 
Princess Victoire was born at the Palace of Versailles on 11 May 1733. She was the seventh child and fifth daughter of King Louis XV of France and Queen Maria Leszczyńska. Unlike the older children of Louis XV, Madame Victoire was not raised at the Palace of Versailles. Rather, she was, in June 1738, sent to live at the Abbey of Fontevraud with her younger sisters, because the cost of raising them in Versailles with all the status they were entitled to was deemed too expensive by Cardinal Fleury, Louis XV's chief minister. She remained there until 1748, when she was aged 15.

According to Madame Campan, the Mesdames had rather a traumatic upbringing in Fontrevault and were not given much education: "Cardinal Fleury, who in truth had the merit of re-establishing the finances, carried this system of economy so far as to obtain from the King the suppression of the household of the four younger Princesses. They were brought up as mere boarders in a convent eighty leagues distant from the Court. Saint Cyr would have been more suitable for the reception of the King’s daughters; but probably the Cardinal shared some of those prejudices which will always attach to even the most useful institutions, and which, since the death of Louis XIV., had been raised against the noble establishment of Madame de Maintenon. Madame Louise often assured me that at twelve years of age she was not mistress of the whole alphabet, and never learnt to read fluently until after her return to Versailles. Madame Victoire attributed certain paroxysms of terror, which she was never able to conquer, to the violent alarms she experienced at the Abbey of Fontevrault, whenever she was sent, by way of penance, to pray alone in the vault where the sisters were interred. A gardener belonging to the abbey died raving mad. His habitation, without the walls, was near a chapel of the abbey, where Mesdames were taken to repeat the prayers for those in the agonies of death. Their prayers were more than once interrupted by the shrieks of the dying man."

Reign of Louis XV

On 24 March 1748, being fifteen and no longer regarded a child, Victoire wrote to her father the king and successfully asked permission to return to court. Louis XV appointed three maids-of-honour to attend her, and sent Marie-Angélique-Victoire de Bournonville, Duchesse de Duras, to collect her and meet her with her brother the crown prince at Sceaux. In November 1750, she was joined by her sisters Sophie and Louise.

Upon their arrival at court, they were not included in the household of their elder sisters Henriette and Adélaïde, the Household of the Mesdames aînées, ('Elder Mesdames') but were given their own Household of the Mesdames cadettes, ('Younger Mesdames') headed by Marie-Angélique-Victoire de Bournonville, Duchesse de Duras.

While their education had been neglected in the convent, they reportedly compensated for this and studied extensively after their return to court, encouraged by their brother, with whom they immediately formed a close attachment: "When Mesdames, still very young, returned to Court, they enjoyed the friendship of Monseigneur the Dauphin, and profited by his advice. They devoted themselves ardently to study, and gave up almost the whole of their time to it; they enabled themselves to write French correctly, and acquired a good knowledge of history. Italian, English, the higher branches of mathematics, turning and dialing, filled up in succession their leisure moments."

Victoire made a success at court and her father with her lively self-assurance and charm; she was also regarded to be a beauty and was described, "Madame Victoire was handsome and very graceful; her address, mien, and smile were in perfect accordance with the goodness of her heart", and "her beautiful, tender, soft brown eyes, fresh complexion [...] and a bright smile gave the impression of happiness and health, which, together with her desire to please, radiated from her whole personality". In 1753, it was suggested that she might eventually marry her brother-in-law, Ferdinand VI of Spain, as his wife, Barbara of Portugal, was seriously ill at the time and expected to die. However, the Queen of Spain survived her illness and lived another five years. No other marriage partner of suitable religion and status was found, and Victoire remained unmarried: with time, she became quite overweight, and because of this, her father the King came to refer to her as ‘Coche’ (Pig/Piggy/Sow), while he called Madame Adélaïde, ‘Loque’ (Tatters/Rag/Rags/Scraggy); Madame Sophie, ‘Graille’ (Grub/Scrap/Carrion crow); and Madame Louise, ‘Chiffe’ (Shoddy silk/Rags).

Victoire, as her sisters, had a close relationship with her brother, viewed her mother as a role model, and followed her sister Madame Adélaïde in her campaign against the influence of Madame de Pompadour and, later, Madame du Barry. She also had a close friendship with her favourite lady-in-waiting the Marquise de Durfort, who "afforded to Madame Victoire agreeable society. The Princess spent almost all her evenings with that lady, and ended by fancying herself domiciled with her." In contrast to her elder sister Adélaïde, Victoire was described as "good, sweet-tempered, and affable", and well liked both by society and her staff.

In 1761, Victoire visited the waters in Lorraine for medical purposes for the first time, in the company of Adélaïde, because of an over amount of food consumption, while their sisters Sophie and Louise visited Paris for the first time.

Madame Campan described the sisters and their life in the years around 1770: "Louis XV. saw very little of his family. He came every morning by a private staircase into the apartment of Madame Adélaïde. He often brought and drank their coffee that he had made himself. Madame Adélaïde pulled a bell which apprised Madame Victoire of the King’s visit; Madame Victoire, on rising to go to her sister’s apartment, rang for Madame Sophie, who in her turn rang for Madame Louise. The apartments of Mesdames were of very large dimensions. Madame Louise occupied the farthest room. This latter lady was deformed and very short; the poor Princess used to run with all her might to join the daily meeting, but, having a number of rooms to cross, she frequently in spite of her haste, had only just time to embrace her father before he set out for the chase. Every evening, at six, Mesdames interrupted my reading to them to accompany the princes to Louis XV.; this visit was called the King’s ‘debotter’,—[Debotter, meaning the time of unbooting.]—and was marked by a kind of etiquette. Mesdames put on an enormous hoop, which set out a petticoat ornamented with gold or embroidery; they fastened a long train round their waists, and concealed the undress of the rest of their clothing by a long cloak of black taffety which enveloped them up to the chin. The chevaliers d’honneur, the ladies in waiting, the pages, the equerries, and the ushers bearing large flambeaux, accompanied them to the King. In a moment the whole palace, generally so still, was in motion; the King kissed each Princess on the forehead, and the visit was so short that the reading which it interrupted was frequently resumed at the end of a quarter of an hour; Mesdames returned to their apartments, and untied the strings of their petticoats and trains; they resumed their tapestry, and I my book."

In 1770, the fourteen-year-old Marie Antoinette became Dauphine by marriage to Madame Victoire's nephew the Dauphin, the future Louis XVI of France. Because of the close relationship between the Dauphin and his aunts, Marie Antoinette also initially came close to the Mesdames during her first years in France as the senior royal women at court. The Mesdames used to take turns with the Countess of Provence in accompanying Marie Antoinette on official assignments. The close relationship between Marie Antoinette and Mesdames was, however, discontinued in 1772, after the attempt to entice Marie Antoinette to humiliate Madame du Barry was thwarted, a plan which had been led by Madame Adélaïde with support of Madame Victoire and Madame Sophie.

Reign of Louis XVI
From April 1774, Madame Victoire and her sisters attended to their father Louis XV on his deathbed until his death from smallpox on 10 May. Despite the fact the sisters had never had smallpox, and the male members of the royal family, as well as the dauphine, were kept away because of the high risk of catching the illness, the Mesdames were allowed to attend to him until his death, being female and therefore of no political importance because of the Salic Law. After the death of Louis XV, he was succeeded by his grandson Louis-Auguste as Louis XVI, who referred to his aunts as Mesdames Tantes. The sisters were in fact infected by their father and fell ill with smallpox (from which they recovered), and were kept in quarantine on a little house near the Palace of Choisy, to which the court evacuated after the death of the king until recovery.

Their nephew the king allowed them to keep their apartments in the Palace of Versailles, and they kept attending court at special occasions - such as for example at the visit of Joseph II, Holy Roman Emperor. However, they distanced themselves from court and often preferred to reside in their own Château de Bellevue in Meudon; they also travelled annually to Vichy, always with a retinue of at least three hundred people, and made the waters there fashionable.

The Mesdames did not get along well with Queen Marie Antoinette. When the queen introduced the new custom of informal evening family suppers, as well as other informal habits which undermined the formal court etiquette, it resulted in an exodus of the old court nobility in opposition to the queen's reforms, which gathered in the salon of the Mesdames. They entertained extensively at Bellevue as well as at Versailles; their salon was reportedly regularly frequented by minister Maurepas, whom Adélaïde had elevated to power, by the Prince of Condé and the Prince of Conti, both members of the anti-Austrian party, as well as Beaumarchais, who read aloud his satires of Austria and its power figures. The Austrian Ambassador Mercy reported that their salon was a centre of intrigues against Marie Antoinette, where the Mesdames tolerated poems satirizing the queen. The Mesdames gathered the extreme conservative Dévots party of the nobility opposed to the philosophers, the encyclopedists and the economists.

Revolution and later life
Madame Victoire and her sister were present at Versailles during the Parisian women's march to Versailles on 6 October 1789, and were among those gathered in the king's apartment on the night of the attack on Marie Antoinette's bedroom. They participated in the wagon train leaving the Palace of Versailles for Paris; on the way, however, their carriage separated from the rest of the procession before they reached Paris. They never took up residence at the Tuileries with the royal family, but preferred to retire to the Château de Bellevue in Meudon instead.

Revolutionary laws against the Catholic Church caused them to apply for passports from their nephew, the King, to travel on pilgrimage to the Basilica of Saint Peter in Rome. Louis XVI signed their passports and notified the Cardinal de Bernis, the French Ambassador to Rome, of their impending arrival. On 3 February 1791, when they were about to leave, anonymous notification of their intentions was sent to the Jacobin Club, which caused a deputation of protest to the National Assembly. On 19 February, a crowd of women assembled at Palais Royal and agreed to march out to the Château de Bellevue in an attempt to stop the Mesdames from departing. The Mesdames were warned and left the château in the carriage of a visitor. They did not have the time to bring their baggage wagons; these were protected, however, and sent after them by General Louis-Alexandre Berthier. They left for Italy in a procession of wagons on 20 February 1791 with a large entourage.

Their departure was given attention in the press. The Chroniqle de Paris wrote: "Two Princesses, sedentary by condition, age, and taste, are suddenly possessed by a mania for travelling and running about the world. That is singular, but possible. They are going, so people say, to kiss the Pope's slipper. That is droll, but edifying. [...] The Ladies, and especially Madame Adélaïde, want to exercise the rights of man. That is natural. [...] "The fair travellers are followed by a train of eighty persons. That is fine. But they carry away twelve millions. That is very ugly. [...]", while the Sahhats Jacobites wrote: "The Ladies are going to Italy to try the power of their tears and their charms upon the princes of that country. Already the Grand Master of Malta has caused Madame Adélaïde to be informed that he will give her his heart and hand as soon as she has quitted France, and that she may count upon the assistance of three galleys and forty-eight cavaliers, young and old. Our Holy Father undertakes to marry Victoire and promises her his army of three hundred men to bring about a counter-revolution."

Their trip was affected by some bad publicity; they were temporarily stopped by a riot against their departure in Moret, and on 21 February, they were detained for several days at a tavern in Arnay-le-Duc, where the municipality wished to confirm their permission to leave from the National Assembly before allowing them to continue. In Paris, the affair caused riots; protesters invaded the gardens of the Tuileries and demanded that the king order his aunts to return to France. The matter was debated in the National Assembly, where M. de Narbonne acted as their spokesperson. Mirabeau convinced the National Assembly that "The welfare of the people cannot depend on the journey the Ladies undertake to Rome; while they are promenading near the places where the Capitol once stood, nothing prevents the edifice of our liberty from rising to its utmost height. [...] Europe will doubtless be much astonished when it learns that the National Assembly of France spent four entire hours in deliberating on the departure of two ladies who would rather hear Mass in Rome - than in Paris." The public at Arnay-le-Duc, however, was not pleased with the decision of the Assembly and so, because of a riot to prevent their departure, the sisters were not able to leave until 3 March.

On several occasions between Lyon and the border, they were exposed to public demonstrations. But they finally left France, crossing the border at Le Pont-de-Beauvoisin, Isère, where they were hooted derisively from the French shore while salvos of artillery from the Italian shore welcomed them to Savoy. They were met by a royal guard of escort and by the chief palace officials of the King of Sardinia, who installed them in the Chateau de Chambery. They continued to visit their niece Clotilde at the royal court of Turin, but stayed only a fortnight: "not even the touching and gracious welcome offered to them by the royal family, the affection shown to them by the Comte d'Artois and the Prince and Princess of Piedmont, their nephew and niece, could make them forget the anguish and perils they had left behind them, and which encircled their family and country with gloom. Mme Victoire wept continuously, Mme Adélaïde did not cry, but she had almost lost the use of speech."

They arrived in Rome on 16 April 1791, where they stayed for about five years. In Rome, the sisters were given the protection of the Pope and housed in the palace of Cardinal de Bernis. In the Friday receptions of Cardinal de Bernis, Cornelia Knight described them: "Madame Adélaïde still retained traces of that beauty which had distinguished her in her youth, and there was great vivacity in her manner, and in the expression of her countenance. Madame Victoire had also an agreeable face, much good sense, and great sweetness of temper. Their dress, and that of their suite, were old-fashioned, but unostentatious. The jewels they brought with them had been sold, one by one, to afford assistance to the poor emigrées who applied to the princesses in their distress. They were highly respected by the Romans; not only by the higher orders, but by the common people, who had a horror of the French revolution, and no great partiality for that nation in general." When news came that Louis XVI and his family had left Paris on the Flight to Varennes in June, a misunderstanding first caused the impression that the escape had succeeded; at this news, "the whole of Rome shouted with joy; the crowd massed itself under the windows of the Princesses crying out: Long live the King!", and the Mesdames arranged a grand banquet for the nobility of Rome in celebration, which had to be interrupted when it was clarified that the escape had in fact failed.

Upon the invasion of Italy by Revolutionary France in 1796, Adélaïde and Victoire left Rome for Naples, where Marie Antoinette's sister, Maria Carolina, was queen, and settled at the Neapolitan royal court in the Palace of Caserta. Queen Maria Carolina found their presence in Naples difficult: "I have the awful torment of harbouring the two old Princesses of France with eighty persons in their retinue and every conceivable impertinence... The same ceremonies are observed in the interior of their apartments here as were formerly at Versailles."

When Naples was invaded by France in 1799, they left for Corfu and finally settled in Trieste, where Victoire died of breast cancer. Adélaïde died one year later. Their bodies were returned to France by Louis XVIII at the time of the Bourbon Restoration and buried at the Basilica of Saint-Denis.

Gallery

Ancestry

See also

 Mesdames de France

References

This article is based on a translation of the equivalent article of the French Wikipedia on 1 November 2006'

Further reading
 Zieliński, Ryszard (1978). Polka na francuskim tronie.'' Czytelnik.

External links 

1733 births
1799 deaths
18th-century French people
18th-century French women
Princesses of France (Bourbon)
French people of Polish descent
People from Versailles
Burials at the Basilica of Saint-Denis
Children of Louis XV
Daughters of kings